Sebastián Pavez (born 30 August 1996) is a Chilean handball player for BM Usab and the Chilean national team.

He represented Chile at the 2019 World Men's Handball Championship.

References

1996 births
Living people
Chilean male handball players
Pan American Games medalists in handball
Pan American Games silver medalists for Chile
Handball players at the 2019 Pan American Games
Medalists at the 2019 Pan American Games
21st-century Chilean people
20th-century Chilean people
South American Games silver medalists for Chile
South American Games bronze medalists for Chile
South American Games medalists in handball
Competitors at the 2018 South American Games
Competitors at the 2022 South American Games